Hum Aapke Dil Mein Rehte Hain is a 1999 Indian Hindi-language romantic drama film directed by Satish Kaushik and produced by D. Ramanaidu for his production company Suresh Productions. It stars Kajol and Anil Kapoor, with Anupam Kher, Shakti Kapoor and Parmeet Sethi in supporting roles. Written by Jainendra Jain, the film tells the story of Megha (Kajol), the wife of industrialist Vishwanath (Anil Kapoor), who was deceived by him for a one-year contract.

Hum Aapke Dil Mein Rehte Hain serves as a remake of Telugu-language film Pavitra Bandham (1996). Kabir Lal served as the cinematographer, while E.M. Madhavan, Chaitanya Tanna and Marthand K. Venkatesh edited the film. The music was composed by Anu Malik and the lyrics were written by Sameer.

Hum Aapke Dil Mein Rehte Hain was released on 21 January 1999 and emerged as a commercial success, with a total gross of  worldwide. It received mixed-to-positive critical reviews, with mostly praise directed towards its story and Kajol's performance. For her portrayal, Kajol was nominated for the Best Actress category at the Filmfare Awards, the International Indian Film Academy Awards, the Screen Awards, and the Zee Cine Awards.

Plot 
Vishwanath is a multi-millionaire industrialist, living with his only son, Vijay. After Vijay completed his education in the United States, Vishwanath forces him to get married but Vijay refuses to, saying that he still wants to be single. Disappointed, Vishwanath (who is suffering from diabetes) tries to convince his son with sweets; it makes Vijay immediately agrees to his demand. Megha, a hardworking girl struggling to support her family, is Vishwanath's personal assistant in his office. Vishwanath asks Megha to quit her job and marry his son, but she refuses when she hears Vijay wants the marriage to be on a contract basis for a year and, if he does not fall in love with his wife in that duration, the marriage will be annulled and Megha will get money as a return. However, Megha's family is in dire financial straits and, so, she has to reconsider this offer.

Vijay and Megha are married. After the marriage, they become friendly with each other and Megha goes out of her way to look after Vijay after he is in a car accident. At the end of the year, however, Vijay decides to annul the marriage, as had been agreed upon, and he regards her as a friend. Megha leaves Vijay and returns home. After the separation, Vijay seems to be enjoying himself; but slowly and eventually, he starts to feel regret after he found the facts that she gets social sanctions for the contract.

In order to support herself, Megha starts a job in a new company; to her surprise, when the company's managing director arrives, he turns out to be Vijay. He later confesses to her that he is a changed person and wants her back. But, even after repeated persuasion, she disagrees because her faith in him has been shattered. Vijay continues to pursue her. Later, Megha finds out that she is pregnant with Vijay's child. Near the completion of her pregnancy, she along with her family then hold a ceremony for the well-being of her to-be-born child. In the ceremony, which Vishwanath and Vijay attends, Megha reveals that the latter to be her husband and tells all the guests about the marriage-contract. An argument follows; Vijay and his father walk out, followed by all the guests.

As a last ditch effort, Vijay's friends make a plan to lure Megha to meet him again. His friends tell her that troublemakers Khairati Lal and Yeshwant Kumar, who had once attempted to kill Vijay in the car accident, have escaped from prison. They are out looking for Vijay, who had fired them from his father's company for cheating and fraud. Megha gets anxious and tries to reach Vijay as soon as possible. On the way, she learns that the whole thing was a set-up, when she caught one of Vijay's friends call him by a payphone. Enraged, Megha heads to Vijay's house to criticize him for this shameless act. Unbeknownst to both Megha and Vijay however, the aforementioned criminals arrive in Vijay's house to kill him. They beat up Vijay, but he soon overpowers them. Eventually though, Khairati stabs Vijay in the stomach with a broken wine bottle thrice, and Yeshwant with a large knife in his back twice. As soon as they hear Megha's footsteps however, they flee the scene, leaving Vijay seriously injured. As soon as Megha meets Vijay, she angrily berates him for playing a prank on her and orders him to never see her again. However, as she turns to leave, Vijay staggers and takes out the broken wine bottle from his stomach, causing blood to pour from the wound. Megha upon seeing the wound, realizes Vijay really was attacked and runs toward him. However, she slips and goes into labour. Vijay, summoning up all his strength, takes Megha to the hospital. There, he is treated for his injuries and she delivers a healthy baby boy. Megha and Vijay recover and get reconciled.

Cast 
The cast is listed below.

 Anil Kapoor as Vijay
 Kajol as Megha
 Gracy Singh as Maya
 Sudha Chandran as Manju
 Anupam Kher as Mr. Vishwanath, Vijay's father
 Rakesh Bedi as Salim
 Satish Kaushik as German, Vijay's secretary
 Adi Irani as Manju's husband
 Shakti Kapoor as Khairati Lal
 Smita Jaykar as Megha's mother
 Sadhu Meher as Badri Prasad
 Raju Shrestha as Sudhakar
 Parmeet Sethi as Yeshwant Kumar
 Mink Brar as Anita
 Johnny Lever as Sunny
 Dinesh Hingoo as Pandit Ramprasad

Kumar Sanu, Anuradha Paudwal and Anu Malik made special appearances in the song "Kasam Se Kasam Se".

Production 
The film is a remake of Muthyala Subbaiah's 1996 Telugu-language film Pavitra Bandham, and it marks the producer D. Ramanaidu's return to Hindi cinema after a long hiatus; he had last produced Taqdeerwala in 1995. In an interview with Rediff.com, Ramanaidu said that his involvement in the project was a way to prove his mettle as a producer in the Hindi film industry: "As far as Telugu films are concerned, I have achieved whatever I wanted to. I want to hit the jackpot in Bollywood with this film." Anil Kapoor was cast as the antagonist Vijay and Anupam Kher as his father, Vishwanath. According to Kapoor, the role had changed his screen image, and he later stated that he took the part to avoid typecasting. Meanwhile, Kajol was cast as the film's protagonist Megha, her first such role. Interviewed by The Telegraph, she stated that her role "seemed like a great character on paper, but [it] didn't translate well on screen".

Satish Kaushik was suggested by Kapoor, who has collaborated with him in several films, including Mr. India (1987), Joshilaay (1989) and Ram Lakhan (1989), to direct this film. Kaushik compared it with his previous directorial ventures—Roop Ki Rani Choron Ka Raja (1993) and Prem (1995)—and found Hum Aapke Dil Mein Rehte Hain "very different", explaining that it "emphasised feelings and that the accent here was on treatment"; for instance, the former was dominant with costume and the latter was based on reincarnation. He said, "I do not resort to any gimmicks in [Hum Aapke Dil Mein Rehte Hain]. I'm not playing with camera angles or juggling shots. You will not find 50 dances here... My film has been set against a contemporary backdrop." Jainendra Jain and Bhupati Raja wrote the dialogue and story, respectively.

Principal photography started in Hyderabad and handed by Kabir Lal. Saroj Khan and Chinni Prakash were the choreographers, while Raja was the action director. Its production design was completed by Sharmishta Roy. Some songs were recorded at the Hotel de Rougemont in Switzerland. After filming finished around December 1998, it was edited by E.M. Madhava, Chaitanya Tanna and Marthand K. Venkatesh.

Soundtrack 

The soundtrack for Hum Aapke Dil Mein Rehte Hain was completed by Anu Malik and the lyrics were written by Sameer. It contains nine songs, with vocals performed by Kumar Sanu, Anuradha Paudwal, Udit Narayan, Alka Yagnik, Sonu Nigam, Hema Sardesai, Rahul Seth, Anu Malik, Abhijeet Bhattacharya, Shankar Mahadevan and Anuradha Sriram. The album was released on 21 December 1998 by T-Series.

Release 
Produced by Suresh Productions and distributed by Melody International, Hum Aapke Dil Mein Rehte Hain was released on 22 January 1999 and ran at theatres for 25 weeks. It faced strong competition from Rishi Kapoor's Aa Ab Laut Chalen, Gulzar's Hu Tu Tu and Shakeel Norani's Bade Dilwala, all of which were released on the same day. The film opened to a wide audience, with 190 screens across India, and grossed  on its opening day. Hum Aapke Dil Mein Rehte Hain earned  on its first weekend and  after its first week. The film thus emerged as one of the highest-grossing female-led films of the year.

The world television premiere of Hum Aapke Dil Mein Rehte Hain happened in October 2000 on Doordarshan. A DVD version was released on 17 July 2007 in a single-disc pack. It was available for streaming on Amazon Prime Video since May 2019.

Critical reception 
Hum Aapke Dil Mein Rehte Hain addressed the issue of prenuptial agreement. It received mixed-to-positive reviews, with critics praising its story, melodramatic climax and the performances, mostly that from Kajol. Sharmila Taliculam, writing for Rediff.com, described the film as a "usual run-of-the-mill story", noting its "sprinkling of drama, comedy, fight [and] romance". She opined that Kajol "manages her role well", with "her eyes [giving] good effect in many scenes", and thought her chemistry with Kapoor managed to "save the film from going downhill in a rush". Taliculam argued that Kapoor's portrayal, which she found "par excellence", would remind the audiences of his roles in Lamhe (1991), Mr. Bechara (1996) and Judaai (1997). A critic from entertainment portal Bollywood Hungama said, "Hum Aapke Dil Mein Rehte Hain is a good enough film if you go for that kind of family tear-jerker." K. N. Vijiyan of the New Straits Times shared similar thoughts, saying, "[It] will be a treat for those who love Anil Kapoor and Kajol, and for those who want something different." In a column for the same publication, he added that the story is "quite refreshing".

Planet Bollywood's Anjali Abrol, who gave the film 7 out of 10, called both Kajol and Kapoor's acting "commendable", and further wrote that "Kajol went a bit overboard with her stubbornness, and the audience went from sympathizing with her to being annoyed with her". Abrol also noted the costume and make-up along with Punjabi nuance and Gujarati-language dialogues in the film, but criticised a comedic scene where Satish Kaushik and Johnny Lever do what the critic called as "horrifying telephone war". Conversely, Mukhtar Anjoom of The Times of India saw that the comedic scene make the film "clean and enjoyable". Deepa Gahlot thought that the film's story was inspired by Indian mythologies and folk tales. In Eena Meena Deeka: The Story of Hindi Film Comedy, Sanjit Narwekar said that Kaushik had proved himself as "a leading director" with the film's success.

Accolades

Notes

References

External links 

 
 

1990s Hindi-language films
Hindi remakes of Telugu films
1999 films
Films scored by Anu Malik
Indian romantic drama films
1999 romantic drama films
Films directed by Satish Kaushik
Suresh Productions films
Films produced by D. Ramanaidu